The 2014 Colorado Rapids season was the club's nineteenth season of existence, and their nineteenth season in Major League Soccer, the top tier of the American and Canadian soccer pyramids.

Finishing eighth in the West and seventeenth overall, the Rapids failed to qualify for the MLS Cup Playoffs, after previously qualifying last year. Despite an upper-mid table performance to start the season, the club was plagued heavily by injuries, causing the team to go winless in their final fourteen matches of the season, twelve of which, were losses. In the U.S. Open Cup, the Rapids won their first fixture against Orlando City, 5–2. In the fifth round, they fell to the Atlanta Silverbacks. Additionally, they were unable to defend their Rocky Mountain Cup title, losing to rivals, Real Salt Lake.

Background

Club

Roster 
Updated July 20, 2014.

Technical Staff 
As of February 18, 2014.

Transfers

Transfers In

Transfers Out

Draft picks

Competitions

Preseason

MLS

U.S. Open Cup

Standings

Major League Soccer

Western Conference standings

Overall table 

Note: the table below has no impact on playoff qualification and is used solely for determining host of the MLS Cup, certain CCL spots, and 2015 MLS draft. The conference tables are the sole determinant for teams qualifying to the playoffs

Results summary

Results by round

Statistics

Top scorers

Top assists

Goalkeeping

Disciplinary record
Includes all competitive matches. The list is sorted by shirt number.

Only competitive matches

Italic: denotes no longer with club.

References

Colorado Rapids seasons
Colorado Rapids
Colorado Rapids
Colorado Rapids